The IPSC Russian Shotgun Championship is an IPSC level 3 championship held once a year by the Russian Federation of Practical Shooting. In reaction to the 2022 Russian invasion of Ukraine, the IPSC cancelled all scheduled and future level 3 and above international competitions in Russia.

Champions 
The following is a list of current and previous champions.

Overall category

Lady category

Senior category

See also 
 Russian Handgun Championship
 Russian Rifle Championship

References 

Match Results - 2003 IPSC Russian Shotgun Championship
Match Results - 2004 IPSC Russian Shotgun Championship
Match Results - 2005 IPSC Russian Shotgun Championship
Match Results - 2006 IPSC Russian Shotgun Championship
Match Results - 2007 IPSC Russian Shotgun Championship
Match Results - 2008 IPSC Russian Shotgun Championship
Match Results - 2009 IPSC Russian Shotgun Championship
Match Results - 2010 IPSC Russian Shotgun Championship
Match Results - 2011 IPSC Russian Shotgun Championship
Match Results - 2012 IPSC Russian Shotgun Championship
Match Results - 2013 IPSC Russian Shotgun Championship
Match Results - 2014 IPSC Russian Shotgun Championship
Match Results - 2015 IPSC Russian Shotgun Championship

IPSC shooting competitions
National shooting championships
Russia sport-related lists
Shooting competitions in Russia